Steel building may refer to:

 A smaller structure made predominantly of steel.  See Steel building.
 A structure with a steel frame.
 The U.S. Steel Tower in Pittsburgh, Pennsylvania.